The Shipley Glen Tramway is a historic funicular tramway located in the wooded Shipley Glen near the village of Saltaire in the English county of West Yorkshire.

Operation 
The line is operated by volunteer staff on behalf of a charitable trust, Shipley Glen Tramway Preservation Co Ltd.

History
The line was opened on 18 May 1895 by Sam Wilson, a local publican, showman and entrepreneur. It was intended to ease access to a number of other, now long closed, attractions at Shipley Glen, including a wooden toboggan ride and a massive fairground. As built, the line was powered by a gas engine. Since 1920 the line has been electrically operated.

In 2002, operation of the line was taken over by a charitable trust under a lease from Bradford City Council. The tramway was temporarily closed in 2010,  to bring it up to modern safety standards. This involved fitting the two tramcars with new chassis, wheels and decks, and improving braking systems on both cars and haulage drum. The line reopened in 2011.

See also 
 List of funicular railways

References

External links

 Shipley Glen Tramway web site
 Hows.org.uk: Shipley Glen Cable Tramway: images and information.
 Bronte-country.com: The Shipley Glen Tramway, with link to images.
 Yorkshire Escapes: Shipley Glen Tramway, story and images.
 YouTube: Shipley Glen Tramway filmed in 1989; 7.5 mins.
 Visitbradford.com: Shipley Glen Cable Tramway, details including directions to site.
 Telegraph & Argus: On track for a great day out, by Emma Clayton, 19 January 2009 Written before tramway closed down for brakes repair.

Funicular railways in the United Kingdom
Tourist attractions in the City of Bradford
Shipley, West Yorkshire
20 in gauge railways in England